Mark Angelo Santos Herras (born December 14, 1986) is a Filipino film and television actor. He won in the reality talent show StarStruck aired in GMA Network. He also appeared in Forever in My Heart, Encantadia, SOP, and I Luv NY, GMA Telebabad.

Filmography

Television

Films

References

External links

1986 births
Filipino male film actors
Filipino male television actors
Participants in Philippine reality television series
GMA Network personalities
Living people
Male actors from Laguna (province)
People from Santa Rosa, Laguna
StarStruck (Philippine TV series) participants
StarStruck (Philippine TV series) winners
Tagalog people
VJs (media personalities)